Agrupación Deportiva Villaviciosa de Odón is a Spanish football team from Villaviciosa de Odón, in the Community of Madrid. Founded in 1971, they currently play in Tercera División RFEF – Group 7.

Season to season

6 seasons in Tercera División
1 season in Tercera División RFEF

Uniform
Uniform holder T-shirt, trousers and half white
Uniform alternative T-shirt, trousers and half blue

Stadium
Their home stadium is the ''Estadio Nuevo Municipal, which seats 10,000 spectators.

Current squad

International players
 Evuy (2009–2012)

External links
Futmadrid.com profile 
Futbolme.com profile 

Football clubs in the Community of Madrid
Association football clubs established in 1971
1971 establishments in Spain